South Florida is the southernmost region of the U.S. state of Florida. It is one of Florida's three most commonly referred to directional regions; the other two are Central Florida and North Florida. South Florida is the southernmost part of the continental United States and the only region of the continental U.S. that includes some areas with a tropical climate.

South Florida is dominated by the Miami metropolitan area and the Everglades, and contains the Florida Keys, three U.S. national parks (namely Biscayne, Dry Tortugas, and Everglades), and multiple cities. While the term most commonly refers to the Keys and Greater Miami, interpretations vary on the inclusion of some other parts of Florida within the South Florida region, most commonly the southern parts of the Tampa Bay area, the inclusion of Southwest Florida and its cities, and the Treasure Coast.

Composition
As with all vernacular regions, South Florida has no official boundaries or status and is defined differently by different sources. A 2007 study of Florida's regions by Ary Lamme and Raymond K. Oldakowski found that Floridians surveyed identified "South Florida" as comprising the southernmost sections of peninsular Florida, meaning from Jupiter, Florida, southward. That area includes the Miami metropolitan area (defined as Miami-Dade, Broward, and Palm Beach counties), the Florida Keys, and the interior region known as the Glades. Additionally, Southwest Florida, representing the state's southern Gulf Coast, has emerged as a directional vernacular region. Some respondents from as far northwest as the southern Tampa Bay area identified their region as being in South Florida rather than Southwest or Central Florida. Confusing the matter further, the University of South Florida, named in part because of its status as the state's southernmost public university at the time of its 1957 founding, is located in Tampa. Florida State Road 70 bisects approximately the southern third of Florida from west to east. 

Enterprise Florida, the state's economic development agency, identifies "Southeast Florida" as one of eight economic regions used by the agency and other state and outside entities, including the Florida Department of Transportation. Some entities alternately designate this region "South Florida". Its definition includes much of the same territory as Lamme and Oldakowski's report (except the Gulf Coast and much of the interior Glades region) as well as additional area. It includes Monroe County (the Keys) and the three metropolitan counties of Miami-Dade, Broward, and Palm Beach, as well as the three "Treasure Coast" counties of Indian River, St. Lucie, and Martin to the north.

Demographics
The demographics of South Florida residents can be segmented as following:

Over 87.2% of all foreigners residing in South Florida come from Latin America.

Political affiliations 
South Florida is politically diverse, with multiple congressional districts in the region supporting both the Democratic and Republican parties. As evidenced by the 2020 United States presidential election, supporters of the Democratic Party are mostly concentrated in urban areas, as well as areas to the west of and including downtown Key West, rural communities surrounding Immokalee, and the areas surrounding Belle Glade, while supporters of the Republican Party reside in the most costal regions of the Miami area north of Pompano Beach, most of the Everglades, most of the regions between Port St. Lucie and Riviera Beach, Southwest Florida, and a supermajority of the region's inland and rural areas.

Cities

Largest cities in South Florida by population:

Culture

Miami accent
The Miami accent is a regional accent of the American English dialect spoken in South Florida, particularly in Miami-Dade, Broward, Palm Beach, and Monroe counties. The accent was born in central Miami, but has expanded to the rest of South Florida in the decades since the 1960s. The Miami accent is most prevalent in American-born South Floridian youth.

The Miami accent is based on a fairly standard American accent but with some changes very similar to dialects in the Mid-Atlantic (especially the New York area dialect, Northern New Jersey English, and New York Latino English.) Unlike Virginia Piedmont, Coastal Southern American, and Northeast American dialects, the "Miami accent" is rhotic; it also incorporates a rhythm and pronunciation heavily influenced by Spanish (wherein rhythm is syllable-timed).

Politics

Lamme and Oldakowski identify several demographic, political, and cultural elements that characterize South Florida and distinguish it from other areas of the state. Many of its differences appear to be driven by its proportionately higher level of migration from the northern U.S. states and from the Caribbean and Latin America, particularly in the densely populated Miami area. Politically, South Florida is more liberal than the rest of the state. While less than 10% of people in either North or Central Florida felt their area was liberal, over a third of South Floridians described their region as such. 38% characterized the area as conservative; 26% as moderate. This tracks with South Florida's demographics, and Lamme and Oldakowski's findings parallel Barney Warf and Cynthia Waddell's research on Florida's political geography during the 2000 Presidential election. The economy in South Florida is very similar to that in Central Florida. Compared to the more diversified economy in North Florida, tourism is by far the most significant industry in South and Central Florida, with a much smaller but vibrant agricultural industry.

Cuisine
Lamme and Oldakowski's survey also found some cultural indicators distinguishing South Florida. South Florida is the only region of the state where ethnic foods are as popular as general American cuisine. Floribbean cuisine is a fusion cuisine which developed in South Florida, drawing influence from Floridian, Caribbean, Asian and Latin American cuisines. Additionally, while there was little geographical variation for most styles of music, there was regional variation for both country and Latin music. Country was significantly less popular in South Florida than in North or Central Florida, while Latin was more popular than in the other regions.

Urban planning
The Anthony J. Catanese Center for Urban and Environmental Solutions at Florida Atlantic University notes the unusual growth pattern of South Florida. Unlike many areas with centralized cities surrounded by development, most of South Florida is  preserved natural area and designated agricultural reserves, with development restricted to a dense, narrow strip along the coast. The developed area is highly urbanized and increasingly continuous and decentralized, with no particular dominant core cities. The center projects this pattern to continue in the future.

Partition proposals

Over time, there have been numerous proposals for partitioning the state of Florida to form a separate state of South Florida. Such proposals have usually been made as political statement  rather than serious attempts at secession. Reasons often stated are cultural, ethnic, economic, and financial frustrations with the state government in Tallahassee, which is in North Florida.

In 2008, the North Lauderdale City Commission passed a resolution calling for a new state of South Florida to be formed from Palm Beach, Broward, Miami-Dade and Monroe Counties.

In 2014, the City of South Miami passed a resolution in favor of splitting the state in half, with a northern boundary drawn to include the counties of Brevard, Orange, Polk, Hillsborough, and Pinellas (roughly the Tampa Bay and Orlando areas). In total, the proposed State of South Florida would have included 24 counties.

See also
 Miami metropolitan area
 Table of United States Metropolitan Statistical Areas

Notes

References

External links 

 Populations of Metropolitan and Micropolitan Area (and rankings)

 
 
Broward County, Florida
Metropolitan areas of Florida
Miami-Dade County, Florida
Palm Beach County, Florida
Regions of Florida
Proposed states and territories of the United States